You're the Reason is the title of Melinda Doolittle's second album, released on November 12, 2013. The EP features original material co-authored by Doolittle, and covers, "Give" and "Home."

Reception 
USA Today said of the release "The new material doesn't rely on the same old-school soul of 2009's Coming Back to You, but there's a snap and crackle not only in the funky grooves of You're the Reason, but in the live-wire energy of Doolittle's delivery." SoulTracks.com said "You're the Reason is a revealing album right from the start...Doolittle is an artist who faced doubts but who emerged with her vision and spirit intact, and who is determined to sing the type of music that she loves - whether singing originals or covers. Her passion for the decision she made shows through on the disc and makes this a welcome, successful return of an Idol favorite."

Track listing 
 "Never Giving Up" (Melinda Doolittle, Jonathan Lee, Tre' Corley)- 3:39
 "Without You" (Doolittle, Corley)- 3:29
 "You're The Reason (U.R.Y.)" (Doolittle, Corley)- 3:49
 "Give" (Connie Harrington, Sonya Isaacs, Jimmy Yeary)- 4:07
 "I Believe In Love" (Michael Ricks, Randy Davis)- 4:23
 "You're The Reason (U.R.Y.) - Extended Version feat. W.I.T." - (Doolittle, Corley) 5:27

Bonus track 
 "Home" (Charlie Smalls)- 3:28

Personnel 
Tre' Corley – executive producer, keys, drums, programming, arrangements, mastering
Paul Corley - executive producer, engineer, mixing
Andy Corley & Frankie Chew - assistant engineers
Melinda Doolittle - executive producer, bgv arrangements
Austin Loftis – guitar
Jeremy Medkiff – guitar
Duncan Mullins – bass
Anthony Matula – art direction
Anthony Matula – photography
Michael Heitzler – exclusive management
Oak Tree Studios – recording & mixing location

References 

2013 EPs
Melinda Doolittle albums